The Neptune class was a proposed class of cruisers planned for the British Royal Navy in the latter years of the Second World War. They were large ships which were to be armed with twelve  dual-purpose guns and with a heavy secondary armament. Although five ships of the class were planned in 1944, they were cancelled following the end of the war, before construction could begin.

Development and design
A small anti-aircraft (AA) cruiser design with six or eight  dual-purpose guns (i.e. capable of both anti-ship and anti-aircraft fire) developed into the July 1943, design N2, armed with four twin 5.25-inch turrets of a new design and displacing  standard, was approved for inclusion in the 1944 construction programme. In October 1943, the First Lord of the Admiralty, Dudley Pound, resigned and his replacement, Andrew Cunningham disliked the small cruiser and work was switched to a large cruiser, described at first as an "improved ", armed with twelve 6-inch guns.

Hull and machinery
The ships were not fitted with facilities for carrying aircraft, so the bridge was lower than in preceding classes of cruiser, while the two superstructure blocks were longer than in previous ships; the forward superstructure extending back to the forward funnel and the aft superstructure covered the base of the aft funnel. A long forecastle was planned, reaching back beyond the aft funnel, although in 1946, it was suggested to change to a flush-deck hull.

One of the problems identified with the small 5.25-inch-armed cruiser was that its speed (  in deep load condition) was inadequate to keep up with the aircraft carriers that the cruisers were meant to escort. The new design therefore had a much higher design speed. The machinery was to be laid out in a unit scheme, with two sets of boilers and turbines separated to reduce the potential for a single torpedo or shell hit to cause complete loss of power. It was noted though by the Director of Naval Construction in June 1945 that the boiler rooms were still too close to avoid the possibility of both being knocked out by a single hit.

Armament
The main gun armament was to be twelve 6-inch (152 mm) guns in four triple turrets. Consideration was given at first to using the existing Mark 24 mountings planned for the Tiger-class ships, as these could be delivered relatively quickly. The Mark 24, which was an improved version of the pre-war turret, was considered old fashioned however. A new mounting was chosen accepting the delays in construction that would ensue. The new turret, the Mark 25, mounted three QF 6 inch Mark V guns, capable of firing at a rate of 10–12 rounds per minute per gun compared with 6-8 for the Mark 24, and elevating to 80 degrees, giving an anti-aircraft capability. The turrets were arranged conventionally on the ships' centreline, with two forward and two aft.

The guns were semi-automatic and fitted with a power loader, giving a maximum rate of fire of 24 rounds per minute per barrel. When the gun entered service, the power rammer proved unreliable and hand loading reduced the rate of fire to about 10–12 rounds per minute per barrel. The close-in anti-aircraft armament consisted of 20 Bofors 40 mm guns in 10 "Buster" self-contained twin mounts and 28 Oerlikon 20 mm cannon in 14 twin mounts. This was arranged with 7 twin Bofors and 4 twin Oerlikons around the bridge, 3 twin Bofors and 8 twin Oerlikons around the aft superstructure and 2 twin Oerlikons at the stern of the ship. Four quadruple 21 inch (533 mm) torpedo tubes were fitted.

Comprehensive fire-control equipment was proposed, with two Low-Angle (LA) directors for the 6-inch guns for use against surface targets, together with four barrage directors for the 6-inch guns for barrage fire against aerial targets, with three combined HA/LA directors for the 4.5-inch guns for use against both surface and air targets. Each Bofors mount was to be fitted with an integrated fire control radar. This gave a capability for up to 17 aerial targets to be engaged simultaneously (four with long-range barrage fire from the 6-inch guns, three by the 4.5-inch guns and ten at short-range by the Bofors guns).

Armour
Longitudinal and transverse armoured bulkheads of up to 4-inch thickness were placed around the ships' machinery compartments and magazines.

Complement
The ships had a planned complement of 1,351 officers and ratings when operating as a flagship.

Construction programme
Five ships of the new design, which was now known as the Neptune class, to be named Neptune, Centurion, Edgar, Mars and Minotaur, were included in the 1944 construction programme. In addition, it was planned to complete the Tiger-class cruiser Bellerophon, construction of which had been suspended before it was laid down, to the new design, giving a total of six ships. Completion by 1950 was expected. The programme continued following the end of the war, with pressure growing to divert shipbuilding capacity to build more profitable ocean passenger liners, with it being hoped in November 1945 that two ships could be laid down as soon as possible. In late February–March 1946 the Sea Lords, in drawing up the 1947 ship programme, decided to cancel the Neptune class. The order for Bellerophon was cancelled with the shipbuilder on 28 February 1946 and the Neptune class stopped in ADM 205/64 due to the lack of finance for cruiser construction in post war austerity Britain and deep division among the naval staff over the role of the cruiser in AA defence and joint operation with aircraft carriers in defence of and attack on trade. Given the priority of air defence, further consideration and planning with the United States Navy was required to determine the desired size and calibre of long range AA guns, and particular study was ordered on the new, US ,  and  classes. The attempts at a follow on Minotaur class, were only marginally smaller, failing to see the Royal Navy could not justify large cruisers post war and the box dimensions of a Tiger or N2 was the limit cost containable or justifiable in industrial or financial UK post-war reality. Work on development of the Mk 3, 5.25-inch twin turret intended for the N2 class, continued on after the 1944 cancellation to 1948 at Elswick. 48rpm for AA and 24rpm for surface engagement was aimed for. In 1948 it was decided to scale down the 5.25-inch to a 5 inch 62 calibre twin. Five inch guns seemed a likely NATO standard with the US Navy developing 5-inch/54 calibre twin and single mounts. The decision later in 1948 against joint development, reflected British desire for independent naval capability and maintenance of its munitions exports. The American gun was really too advanced for much collaboration, but the US single mount was in service by 1953 and a 27rpm success, a decade later. Britain's ambitious plan for a  5-inch 62 calibre twin 60rpm mount, was beyond UK industry as was the 1951 lighter, single 5/62 calibre of 40rpm, medium range AA was beyond UK capability at the time for lightweight design, cost and machine tools for the cruiser destroyer which was finally abandoned in 1953 or even the final (Z- Zed) March 1955 conventional RN cruiser 85Z proposal of the future RN CNC, the enhanced 'Tiger/ N2 class' 8000 tons gun cruiser with 2 twin inch 5 inch, three twin 3/70, 4 STAAG Mk 2 and AD/AW 965 which the Admiralty board would have approved for the 1956 programme, but was vetoed by the Chief Naval Gunnery due to failure of past 5-inch guns development and the fact that development of new guns was too expensive and could not compete with Sea Slug missile development for resources.

Notes

Citations

Sources

Cruiser classes
Abandoned military projects of the United Kingdom
Cancelled ships
Proposed ships of the Royal Navy
Ship classes of the Royal Navy